Knights Hill is a hill that is part of the Illawarra Range with an elevation of  AMSL. The peak is located 8 km South-west of Albion Park and comprises several other small hills, atop a plateau adjacent to the escarpment edge. 

Atop the plateau are TV antennas and a small farm. The name first appeared in a map by Surveyor Robert Hoddle, after whom the Hoddles Track is named. Hoddle first surveyed the region in the early 19th century. 

The hill can be seen from the coastal plain to the North as far as Stanwell Park. One of the television aerials emits a constant light pulse which can be seen from as far as Wollongong. 

The hill is also one of the highest points on the Illawarra escarpment.

References

Municipality of Kiama
Wollongong
Illawarra escarpment